Montenegro–Ukraine relations relate to bilateral relations between Montenegro and Ukraine. Formal relations began on 15 June 2006 when Ukraine recognized Montenegro, less than two weeks after the Parliament of Montenegro declared the independence of Montenegro from Serbia.  Both countries established diplomatic relations on 22 August 2006. Montenegro has an embassy in Kyiv. Ukraine has an embassy in Podgorica. 
Although economic ties are weak, Montenegro is a transit point for human trafficking between Ukraine and the rest of Europe.

Official visits and statements

In 2006, Montenegrin President Filip Vujanović visited President of Ukraine Victor Yushchenko. In October 2008, Professor Željko Radulović, Ambassador Extraordinary and Plenipotentiary of Montenegro to Ukraine, presented his letters of credence to the Ukrainian President. In December 2008, the Ukrainian non-resident extraordinary and plenipotentiary ambassador Anatoliy Oliynyk was dismissed and replaced by Oksana Slyusarenko.  In February 2009, the Montenegrin Deputy Prime Minister and the Minister of Finance, Igor Lukšić met Oksana Slysarenko and discussed common interests including banking and economic cooperation.

In July 2009, on Montenegro's third anniversary as an independent state, President of Ukraine Victor Yushchenko sent his congratulation to President of Montenegro Filip Vujanovic. Later that month Ukraine's Deputy Premier for European and International Integration met his Montenegrin counterpart and expressed support for Montenegro's aspirations for European integration.

Agreements

In September 2006, the two countries agreed to cooperate in fighting money laundering. In March 2008, Ukraine said it was initiating an agreement on visa free travel with Montenegro. In October 2008, the Foreign Ministers of Ukraine and Montenegro initialed an agreement on friendship and cooperation between two countries. In June 2009 the two governments signed an agreement on mutual assistance in customs matters.

Human trafficking

Montenegro has been identified as a transit point for human trafficking between Ukraine and the European Union. Vulnerable groups in Ukraine include women in prostitution, unaccompanied foreign minors, ethnic Romani and foreign construction workers. The "Balkan route" is a notorious path for sex-trade traffickers from Eastern European countries such as Ukraine. However, Montenegro has denied UN allegations on human trafficking.

See also 
 Foreign relations of Montenegro
 Foreign relations of Ukraine
 Accession of Montenegro to the European Union 
 Accession of Ukraine to the European Union 
 Montenegro–Russia relations

References

External links 
  Ukrainian embassy in Belgrade (also accredited to Montenegro)

 
Ukraine
Bilateral relations of Ukraine